Pita Te Turuki Tamati Moko (9 May 1885 – 8 June 1943) was a notable New Zealand  land agent, commission agent and Ratana administrator. Of Māori descent, he identified with the Ngati Whakaue and Te Arawa iwi.

He was born in Rotorua, New Zealand on 9 May 1885.

He stood in Eastern Maori in the 1928 and 1931 general elections, coming second to Āpirana Ngata.

References

1885 births
1943 deaths
New Zealand Rātanas
Ngāti Whakaue people
Te Arawa people
New Zealand Māori public servants
People from Rotorua
Māori politicians
Unsuccessful candidates in the 1928 New Zealand general election
Unsuccessful candidates in the 1931 New Zealand general election